In Minister of Education v Syfrets Trust, an important case in the South African law of succession, the deceased was a doctor who died in 1951, and set up a charitable trust in terms of his will at the University of Cape Town. In terms of the trust, applicants who wished to utilise these funds had to be white males who were not Jewish. The court held that these requirements for eligibility discriminated on the basis of race, religion and sex, and held that the trust funds should instead be available to any applicant.

See also 
 South African law of succession

References 
 Minister of Education v Syfrets Trust Ltd NO 2006 (4) SA 205 (C).

Notes 

South African case law
2006 in South African law
2006 in case law